The Guelb El-Kebir massacre took place in the village of Guelb el-Kebir, near Beni Slimane, in the Algerian province of Medea, on 20 September 1997. 53 people were killed by attackers that were not immediately identified, though the attack was similar to others carried out by Islamic groups opposed to the Algerian government.

See also
List of massacres in Algeria

References

Algerian massacres of the 1990s
1997 in Algeria
Conflicts in 1997
Massacres in 1997
September 1997 events in Africa